Mvula Sanda Airport  is a grass airstrip serving the village of Kizulu in Kongo Central Province, Democratic Republic of the Congo. The runway is poorly marked, but corner markers are visible on the northeastern end.

See also

Transport in the Democratic Republic of the Congo
List of airports in the Democratic Republic of the Congo

References

External links
 OpenStreetMap - Mvula Sanda
 OurAirports - Mvula Sanda
 Mvula Sanda Airport

Airports in Kongo Central Province